State Route 235 (SR 235) is a primary state highway in the U.S. state of Virginia.  The state highway runs  between intersections with U.S. Route 1 (US 1) in Fort Belvoir and Hybla Valley.  SR 235 forms a southeast loop off of US 1 through the community of Mount Vernon in southeastern Fairfax County, connecting US 1 with Mount Vernon, the plantation home of George Washington, and the southern end of the George Washington Memorial Parkway.

Route description

SR 235 begins at an intersection with US 1 (Richmond Highway) just east of Fort Belvoir opposite the entrance to Woodlawn, a portion of George Washington's estate that also contains the 20th century Pope-Leighey House.  The state highway heads southeast as Mount Vernon Memorial Highway, a two-lane undivided controlled-access highway.  SR 235 passes a recreation of George Washington's Gristmill, crosses Dogue Creek, and passes an entrance to Fort Belvoir.  The state highway curves to the northeast and intersects Old Mill Road and Ferry Landing Road, both part of SR 623, an oblique intersection just west of Grist Mill Park.  SR 235 continues east, curving toward the south and intersects another Old Mill Road and SR 623, now named Old Mount Vernon Road, before reaching the Mount Vernon plantation, a National Historic Landmark.  The roadway continues east as George Washington Memorial Parkway, which serves the estate then follows the Potomac River as a four-lane automobile parkway north to Alexandria and Washington.  SR 235 turns north onto Mount Vernon Highway, a two-lane undivided highway without access controls that passes through the Mount Vernon community.  The state highway passes Mount Vernon High School and meets SR 623 (Old Mount Vernon Road) on a tangent before reaching its northern terminus at US 1 (Richmond Highway) in Hybla Valley.

Major intersections

References

External links

Virginia Highways Project: VA 235

235
State Route 235